John Wayne Mason, M.D. (February 9, 1924 – March 4, 2014) was an American physiologist and researcher who specialized in the interplay between human emotions and the endocrine system.  Mason is regarded as an international leader and theoretician in the field of stress research, where he was one of the field's most prominent voices speaking out against the reigning model of stress promoted by Hans Selye.

Challenging the Stress Concept 

Hans Selye's original concept of stress as a biological process has had an enormously stimulating effect on many areas of medicine and biology over the past seventy years, and continues to shape how people understand stress today.  While many researchers have taken Selye's experiments and interpretations at face value, Mason noticed that Selye repeatedly referred to emotional factors in these experiments as “mere nervous stimuli,"  downplaying the role of the mind. Yet Walter Cannon’s prior work with animals, and Mason’s own experiments at the Walter Reed Army Institute of Research (WRAIR) with both animals and human subjects, suggested that these “mere” stimuli were actually highly significant, and that the psychological and emotional state of the subjects under study required more careful attention.

Over the course of his career at WRAIR, the West Haven VA Medical Center, and Yale University, Mason repeatedly challenged Selye to recognize the many flaws in his biological theory and to accept the importance of psychological factors in stress and disease. Mason and Selye's   exchange of arguments and rebuttals in the Journal of Human Stress,  received popular press both at the time and more recently as a crucial turning point in the history of stress as a concept, and as the beginning of experimentally-validated integrative medicine.

Selected publications 

 
 Mason JW. Psychological influences on the pituitary-adrenal cortical system.  Recent Progress in Hormone Research 15:345-389, 1959.
 
 Wolff CT, Friedman SB, Hofer MA, Mason JW.  Relationship between psychological defenses and mean urinary 17-OHCS excretion rates: Part I.  A predictive study of parents of fatally ill children" Psychosomatic Medicine 26:576-591, 1964.
 
 Mason JW.  Organization of Psychoendocrine Mechanisms" Psychosomatic Medicine 30:565-808,1968.
 
 Mason JW.  Organization of the multiple endocrine responses to avoidance in the monkey" Psychosomatic Medicine 30:774-790, 1968.
 
 
 
 
 
 
 
 Mason JW.  Specificity in the organization of neuroendocrine response profiles.  In Seeman P Brown G (Eds), Frontiers in Neuroscience and Neuroscience Research, University of Toronto Press:Toronto, 68-80, 1974

References 

1924 births
2014 deaths
American physiologists
Indiana University alumni